Ennennum Kannettante is a 1986 Indian Malayalam-language romance film, written and directed by Fazil, starring newcomers Sangeet Pillai and Sonia G. Nair. The film won the Kerala State Film Award for Best Film with Popular Appeal and Aesthetic Value for the year 1986. Srividya won the Kerala State Film Award for Second Best Actress also for this film. Despite all the critical acclaim, the film was a box office failure. It was remade in Tamil by the same director as Varusham 16 and also in Kannada as Halli Krishna Delhi Radha (1992).

Plot 
Ennennum Kannettante is a teenage love story. It tells of the incomplete love of 19-year-old Kannan and 16-year-old Radhika.

Kannan comes from Trivandrum to his Valiya Koikkal Tharavadu (ancestral house) with his mother to spend vacation and to attend the festival in their family temple, the Pookkulangara Devi temple. There are his relatives, like grandfather Parameswara Kurup, grandmother, head of the family and his aunt Vijayalakshmi and her children. Everybody likes Kannan very much, and he has a good time along with his friend Gopu.

But with the arrival of his uncle's daughter (Murappennu) Radhika from Bangalore after a gap of nine years to perform her dance debut (Arangettam) in the temple, everyone's attention turns to her. Kannan initially felt sad and angry but, once he sees Radhika, immediately falls in love with her. Kannan and Radhika were childhood friends and both have memories of their childhood. Radhika also likes Kannan, but was afraid to reveal it to Kannan. To know whether Radhika loves him, Kannan plans to ask her secretly and hides himself in the bathroom. Radhika sees him and cries aloud. The whole family learns of the incident, and Kannan was blamed by all, including his mother. She sent message to Kannan's father to take him back to Trivandrum for his exams. Meanwhile, Radhika revealed to Kannan that she loves him as much as he loved her. Soon, Kannan's father took him back to the city.

After finishing the exams, Kannan rushed back to the village to meet Radhika, but she has already gone to the railway station to return to Bangalore and then to the United States with her parents. Kannan rushed to the station. As he reached it, the train left and he couldn't meet Radhika one last time, even though he chased her train. Radhika left a souvenir for him on the platform, but the heartbroken Kannan didn't see it.

Cast 
 Sangeet Pillai as Kannan
 Sonia G. Nair as Radhika
 Appa Haja as Gopu
 Nedumudi Venu as Tharavadu Karanavar
 Thilakan as Parameswara Kurup (Kannan's grandfather)
 K. P. Ummer as Kannan's father
 Srividya as Kannan's mother
 Jagathy Sreekumar as Padmanabha Pillai
 Jalaja as Vijayalakshmi (Viji)
 Sukumari
 Meena as Maheswari
 Adoor Bhavani

Soundtrack 

This was the first work of poet Kaithapram Damodaran as a lyricist. Kaithapram used to write poems in Mathrubhumi, and this brought him to the notice of playback singer K. J. Yesudas, who asked him to write lyrics for his Tharangini Records. Fazil heard some of these, and asked Kaithapram to write the lyrics for the film.

References

External links 
 
 Ennennum Kannettante at the Malayalam Movie Database
 Ennennum Kannettante at AMMA Official website

1980s coming-of-age films
1980s Malayalam-language films
1980s romance films
1980s teen romance films
Coming-of-age romance films
Films scored by Jerry Amaldev
Indian coming-of-age films
Malayalam films remade in other languages